The Omaha Racers were an American minor league basketball team based in Omaha, Nebraska. The franchise played in the Continental Basketball Association (CBA) from 1989 to 1997. The team's franchise liage started in 1982 as the Wisconsin Flyers. The franchise spent two seasons in Rochester, Minnesota before relocating to Omaha in 1989 to become the Racers. The team's home venue was Ak-Sar-Ben Arena. Throughout the entire history of the Racers, Mike Thibault served as the team's head coach and led Omaha to appearances in two CBA Finals. The team was victorious over the Grand Rapids Hoops during the 1993 CBA Finals.

Franchise history

Wisconsin Flyers (1982–87)

Rochester Flyers (1987–89)
The Rochester Flyers would finish 20-34 (fifth place in the Western Division) in the 1987–88 season, failing to qualify for the CBA playoffs. In 1988–89 the Flyers finished last in the West with a 16-38 record. Despite averaging approximately 2,600 fans per home game, the team moved to Omaha, Nebraska after the season.

Omaha Racers (1989–1997)

Before the start of the Racers inaugural season, the CBA ruled that the team's ownership was not financially solvent and franchise would need to be put up for sale. Terren Peizer purchased the team on September 15, 1989 and announced he would keep the team in Omaha. Team president and general manager Mike Cole told Ray Waddell of Amusement Business, "We're very happy with how it has worked out [...] We pulled off something many people said we couldn't do." Under head coach Mike Thibault, the Racers went 29-27 in 1989–90 and made the CBA playoffs in the National Conference, where they lost to the San Jose Jammers in the first round. It was the first post-season appearance for the franchise since Detroit swept them in the 1984–1985 Western Division final. 

On February 4, 1990, Racers player Roland Gray set a franchise record for points scored in a game with 45 in a game against the San Jose Jammers. The 1990–91 Racers would have the best record in franchise history (39-17), but lost to the Quad City Thunder in the American Conference finals. Tim Legler was named the team's most valuable player following the season.

Moving back to the National Conference in 1991–92, Omaha finished second in the Northern Division (37-19) to the Rapid City Thrillers. After defeating the Oklahoma City Cavalry in the second round of the playoffs, the Racers lost to the Thrillers in the conference finals, 3 games to 2.

The 1992–93 Racers made it to the top, after finishing second in the Northern Division (28-28) again to Rapid City. Omaha beat the Wichita Falls Texans in the first round, then slipped past Rapid City in a five-game conference final. In the CBA championship, Omaha defeated the Grand Rapids Hoops in six games. A 106-98 win on May 1, 1993 in Grand Rapids would be the high-water mark of the franchise. In spite of their success, the attendance dropped during the 1992–93 season, which promoted team officials to announce that if they failed to sell 3,500 season tickets before the start of the next season the Racers would relocate. Omaha averaged 3,062 attendees per game during the 1992–93 season, which was down from 3,875 per game the season before.

Rapid City finished ahead of Omaha (30-26) in the Northern Division for the third straight year in 1993–94. Omaha made it back to the CBA finals, after defeating the Tri-City Chinook in round one and Rapid City in the conference finals. The Quad City Thunder defeated Omaha in five games to win the league title.

Omaha (26-30) moved to the Southern Division in 1994–95 and finished second to Oklahoma City. They beat the Sioux Falls SkyForce in the first round, but fell to Oklahoma City in the second round. Thibault missed seven games as head coach, being replaced by Eric Chapman, as he coached the US in the 1995 Pan American Games in Argentina.

Omaha (28-28) moved back to the Northern Division of the National Conference in 1995–96, and finished second again, this time to Sioux Falls. The Florida Beachdogs swept the Racers out of the playoffs in round one.

With the CBA shrinking to 11 teams in 1996–97, Omaha was placed in the 5-team National Conference and finished in fourth place (22-34). In one of the biggest upsets in CBA playoff history, the Racers defeated Sioux Falls (47-9) in five games, winning the clincher in South Dakota, 98-92. Oklahoma City brought them back down to earth, winning the conference finals, 3 games to 1. During their final season, Kevin Kugler served as the Racers play-by-play announcer.

With a record of 375-413, plus a 42-49 mark in the playoffs, and one CBA title (1992–93), the Wisconsin/Rochester/Omaha Racers franchise was declared inactive in the summer of 1997. At the time, there was some faint hope that the franchise may start up again in 1998–99. The two teams who had made the CBA finals in 1997, Oklahoma City and Florida, also folded.

In 2013, on the 20 anniversary of Omaha's 1993 CBA Championship win, 30 former Racers players, staff and executives gathered for a reunion event at Ralston Arena.

Season-by-season standings

Awards and accolades
1993 CBA Champions
1993 & 1994 National Conference Champions
1990–91 All-CBA Team: Tim Legler
1990–91 All-CBA Defense Team: Willie Simmons
1990–91 All-CBA Rookie Team: Brian Howard
1992–93 All-CBA First Team: Tim Legler
1993 CBA Playoffs Most Valuable Player: Jim Thomas
Corey Gaines led the CBA with 11.6 assists per game during the 1989–1990 season

All-time roster

Alaa Abdelnaby
Jerry Adams
Randy Allen
Ted Allen
Herb Baker
 Darien Baptiste 
Mike Bell
Alex Blackwell
Pat Bolden
David Boone
Dudley Bradley
Willie Brand
Torgeir Bryn
Bruce Chubick
Ben Coleman
Jerome Coles
Steve Colter
Jeffty Connelly
Duane Cooper
Steve Criss
Deryl Cunningham
Michael Curry
Robyn Davis
Mario Donaldson
Kenny Drummond
Chip Engelland
Wayne Engelstad
Michael Evans
Matt Fish
Kevin Franklin
Corey Gaines
Chad Gallagher
Sean Gay
Barry Glanzer
Paul Graham
Ronnie Grandison
Roland Gray
Geert Hammink
Darrin Hancock
Phil Handy
Holman Harley
Quinn Harwood
Mike Higgins
Nate Higgs
Johnnie Hilliard
Anthony Houston
Brian Howard
Cedric Hunter
William Hunter
Dave Jamerson
Darryl Johnson
Jerry Johnson
Sam Johnson
Mike Jones
Ricky Jones
Bart Kofoed
Tim Legler
Jim Les
Cedric Lewis
Malcolm Mackey
Brian Martin
Erik Martin
James Martin
Warren Martin
Rod Mason
Clinton McDaniel
Ron Moore
Howard Nathan
Craig Neal
Sebastian Neal
Dyron Nix
Dan O'Sullivan
Matt Othick
Mark Peterson
Tim Price
Joe Rhett
Keith Robinson
Clifford Rozier
John Strickland
Melvin Robinson
Ricky Robinson
Willie Simmons
Charles Smith
Alex Stivrins
John Strickland
Joe Temple
Jim Thomas
Dean Thompson
Kerwin Thompson
Patrick Tompkins
Tommy Tormohlen
Kenny Travis
Reginald Turner
Mark Wade
Paul Weakley
Kelsey Weems
Scott Wilke
Greg Wiltjer
Al Wood
Steve Wright
Kenny Young
Rodney Zimmerman
Gus Gonidakis 

Sources

Notes

External links
 History of the CBA
 Omaha Professional Basketball
 Shatel, Tom (August 22, 2013). "Shatel: Owner, fans had a blast in the heyday of the Racers". Omaha World Herald. Omaha, Nebraska.
Semi-pro Basketball Players: Omaha Racers via Long Haul Productions
Basketball teams in Minnesota
Basketball teams in Nebraska
Continental Basketball Association teams
Defunct basketball teams in the United States
1989 establishments in Nebraska